"Vallotti" may refer to:
 Francesco Antonio Vallotti, an Italian composer, music theorist, and organist.
 Vallotti temperament, a musical well-temperament devised by the aforementioned Francesco Vallotti